Championship Manager 03/04 is a football management game in the Championship Manager series. The game showcases a whole host of new features and improvements including four new leagues, a pre-game database editor, the ability to view previously saved matches and updated player, team and competition data for the 03/04 season.

The game features 43 countries leagues playable across more than 100 divisions, a database of more than 200,000 footballers from around the world, and stats rated by an army of more than 2,500 researchers.

This was the last game in the series to be produced prior to the Eidos - Sports Interactive split.

Reception
Championship Manager: Season 03/04 received a "Platinum" sales award from the Entertainment and Leisure Software Publishers Association (ELSPA), indicating sales of at least 300,000 copies in the United Kingdom.

References

External links

2003 video games
Eidos Interactive games
Classic Mac OS games
Multiplayer hotseat games
MacOS games
Windows games
Association football management video games
Video games developed in the United Kingdom